A list of books and essays about James Cameron:

Bibliography
Cameron, James